Perginae is a subfamily of sawflies in the family Pergidae. There are about 8 genera and more than 60 species in Perginae.

Genera
These eight genera belong to the subfamily Perginae:
 Acanthoperga Shipp, 1894
 Antiperga Benson, 1939
 Cerealces Kirby, 1882
 Paraperga Ashmead, 1898
 Perga Leach, 1817
 Pergagrapta Benson, 1939
 Pseudoperga Guérin-Ménéville, 1844
 Xyloperga Shipp, 1894

References

Tenthredinoidea